Evangeline is a 1929 American silent film directed by Edwin Carewe and starring Dolores del Río. An Arthur Hopkins produced play made it to Broadway in 1913. It is the last silent film version of the 1847 poem of the same name by Henry Wadsworth Longfellow. This film was released with a Vitaphone disc selection of dialogue, music, and sound effects.

Cast
Dolores del Río as Evangeline
Roland Drew as Gabriel
Alec B. Francis as Father Felician
Donald Reed as Baptiste
Paul McAllister as Benedict Bellefontaine
James A. Marcus as Basil
George F. Marion as Rene LeBlanc
Bobby Mack as Michael
Louis Payne as Governor-General
Lee Shumway as Colonel Winslow

References

External links

 Evangeline; lobby poster

1929 films
American silent feature films
Films based on works by Henry Wadsworth Longfellow
Films directed by Edwin Carewe
1929 drama films
Silent American drama films
American black-and-white films
1920s English-language films
1920s American films